Wilhelm Martin Philipp Christian Ludwig Liebknecht (29 March 1826 – 7 August 1900) was a German socialist and one of the principal founders of the Social Democratic Party of Germany (SPD). His political career was a pioneering project combining Marxist revolutionary theory with practical legal political activity. Under his leadership, the SPD grew from a tiny sect to become Germany's largest political party. He was the father of Karl Liebknecht and Theodor Liebknecht.

Biography

Early years 
Wilhelm Liebknecht was born in 1826 in Giessen, the son of Katharina Elisabeth Henrietta (née Hirsch) and Hessian public official Ludwig Christian Liebknecht.  Liebknecht grew up with relatives after the death of his parents in 1832. From 1832 to 1842, he went to school at the Gymnasium of Giessen, then began studying philology, theology and philosophy in Giessen, Berlin and Marburg. The life story of his maternal great-uncle, the Protestant pastor and democratic activist Friedrich Ludwig Weidig, influenced young Liebknecht’s social and political attitudes relatively early on. He studied the writings of Saint-Simon, from which he gained his first interest in communism, and had been converted to the extreme republican theories of which Giessen was a centre. After some trouble with the authorities as a result of participating in student radicalism, Liebknecht decided to emigrate to the United States.

While on a train to a port city, quite by chance, he met the headmaster of a progressive school in Zurich, Switzerland, and Liebknecht impulsively decided to accept an offer to be an unpaid teacher at that school. Thus he found himself in Switzerland in 1847 as a civil war began in that country. He reported these events for a German newspaper, the Mannheimer Abendzeitung, beginning a career in journalism that he would pursue for the next five decades.

Revolution of 1848 
When revolution erupted in Paris in February 1848, Liebknecht hurried to the scene. He arrived too late to do much in Paris, but he did join a legion that was traveling to Germany to instigate revolution there. During that poorly planned expedition, he was arrested in Baden and charged with treason. On the eve of his trial, revolution erupted once more, and a mob secured his release. He then became a member of the Badische Volkswehr and an adjutant of Gustav von Struve  and fought in the ill-fated Reichverfassungskämpfe ("federal constitution wars"). After the revolutionaries' defeat, he escaped to Switzerland and became a leading member of the Genfer Arbeiterverein (Worker's Association of Geneva), where he met Friedrich Engels.

Years of exile 
In 1850, Liebknecht was arrested for his initiatives to unite Switzerland's German workers' associations and was banished from the country. With few options available, like many veterans of the recently failed revolution, he relocated his exile to London, where he stayed from 1850 to 1862. There he became a member of the Communist League.  During these years, he developed a lifelong friendship and collaboration with Karl Marx. In 1862, after an amnesty for the participants in the revolution of 1848, he returned to Germany and became a member of Ferdinand Lassalle's General German Workers' Association (Allgemeiner Deutscher Arbeiterverein, ADAV), the precursor of the Social Democratic Party of Germany (SPD).

Return to Germany 
From 1864 to 1865, Liebknecht also worked for the magazine Der Social-Demokrat (The Social Democrat) published by Jean Baptista von Schweitzer. However, he soon found himself in disagreement with the paper's friendly position toward Prussia and its new Minister-President Otto von Bismarck. Liebknecht quit the editorial staff and was forced to leave the ADAV due to pressure from Schweitzer. After being evicted from Berlin by government authorities, Liebknecht moved to Leipzig, where he met August Bebel, with whom he founded the Sächsische Volkspartei (Saxon People's Party) in 1867 and the Social Democratic Workers' Party of Germany (Sozialdemokratische Arbeiterpartei Deutschlands, SDAP) in 1869 in Eisenach. During these years, he was elected to the national legislature, where he conducted a determined but futile opposition to Bismarck's policies. Liebknecht was also the editor of the party newspaper, Der Volksstaat (The People's State).

When the Franco-Prussian War began in 1870, Liebknecht used his newspaper to agitate against the war, calling on working men on both sides of the border to unite in overthrowing the ruling class. As a result, he and Bebel were arrested and charged with treason. It is worth noting that Liebknecht opposed the war regardless of which side started it. His call for revolutionary opposition to the war directly contradicts what his party (the SPD) would do in 1914 when World War I began as at that time, with Liebknecht long dead, his successors opted to back the German cause in the war.

Treason trial 
In 1872, both Liebknecht and Bebel were convicted and sentenced to two years of Festungshaft ("imprisonment in a fortress"). This was one of sixteen times that Liebknecht's politics resulted in his conviction and incarceration.

Return to politics 
He also became publisher of the newly founded party organ Vorwärts (Forward), arguing for the integration of Marxist theories into the SAPD's program in his articles.

From 1878 to 1890, the German government outlawed Liebknecht's party, but the terms of the law allowed the party to participate in elections and its elected delegates to participate in the Reichstag. Liebknecht used his position as a Reichstag member to criticize the political situation and opposed the tendencies in his own party toward anarchism on the one hand and accommodation with Bismarck on the other. Maintaining a radical and unified stance, the SAPD emerged from outlawry in 1890 as the Social Democratic Party of Germany (Sozialdemokratische Partei Deutschlands, SPD), taking 20% of the vote in the Reichstag election.

In 1891, Liebknecht became editor-in-chief of Vorwärts and one of the originators of the SPD's new Marxist-inspired party platform. Throughout that decade, he continued to serve in the Reichstag and to appear at political conventions of the SPD as a prominent participant. Despite his advanced age, he also was a major organizer of the Second International, successor to the International Workingmen's Association.

Death and legacy 
Liebknecht died aged 74 on 7 August 1900 in Charlottenburg, a suburb of Berlin. 50,000 people joined his funeral procession.

Works 
 Robert Blum und Seine Zeit, Nürnberg, 1896 (German)
 Ein Blick in die Neue Welt, Stuttgart, 1887
 Die Emscher Depesche oder wie Kriege gemacht werden, Nürnberg, 1895
 Robert Owen:  Sein Leben und sozialpolitischen Wirken, Nürnberg, 1892
 Zur Grund- und Bodenfrage, Leipzig, 1876
 Karl Marx: Biographical Memoirs, Chicago, 1906

See also 
 Social Democratic Party of Germany
 State capitalism

Footnotes

Further reading 
 Raymond H. Dominick III, Wilhelm Liebknecht and the Founding of the German Social Democratic Party. Chapel Hill, NC: University of North Carolina Press, 1982.
 Pelz, William A. (ed.), Wilhelm Liebknecht and German Social Democracy: A Documentary History. Westport, CT: Greenwood Press, 1994.

External links 

 Wilhelm Liebknecht Internet Archive, at the Marxists Internet Archive
 Archive of Wilhelm Liebknecht Papers at the International Institute of Social History

1826 births
1900 deaths
People from Giessen
People from the Grand Duchy of Hesse
Social Democratic Party of Germany politicians
Members of the Reichstag of the North German Confederation
Members of the 2nd Reichstag of the German Empire
Members of the 3rd Reichstag of the German Empire
Members of the 4th Reichstag of the German Empire
Members of the 5th Reichstag of the German Empire
Members of the 6th Reichstag of the German Empire
Members of the 8th Reichstag of the German Empire
Members of the 9th Reichstag of the German Empire
Members of the 10th Reichstag of the German Empire
Members of the Second Chamber of the Diet of the Kingdom of Saxony
German anti-war activists
German prisoners and detainees
Political party founders
Vorwärts editors